Tuberolamia grilloides is a species of beetle in the family Cerambycidae. It was described by Touroult and Demez in 2012.

References

Morimopsini
Beetles described in 2012